Alexander Sanchez may refer to:

 Alexander Sánchez (born 1984), Peruvian footballer
 Alexander Sanchez, member of the Swedish Eudoxa think-tank
 Alexander Sanchez, Men's Elite Road Race Champion of Costa Rica in the 2008 national cycling championships